Ali Hussein Shafi (born 10 April 1908, date of death unknown) was an Egyptian football midfielder who played for Egypt in the 1934 FIFA World Cup. He also played for Zamalek SC, and was part of Egypt's squad at the 1936 Summer Olympics, but he did not play in any matches.

References

1908 births
Year of death missing
Egyptian footballers
Egypt international footballers
Association football midfielders
Zamalek SC players
1934 FIFA World Cup players
Olympic footballers of Egypt
Footballers at the 1936 Summer Olympics